This is a timeline of Philippine history, comprising important legal and territorial changes and political events in the Philippines and its predecessor states. To read about the background to these events, see history of the Philippines.

Pre-historic

11th centuries BCE

9th–10th centuries BCE

1st century BCE

2nd–3rd century

4th century onwards

7th century

8th century

10th century

11th century

12th century

13th century

14th century

15th century

16th century

1500s

1520s

1530s

1540s

1560s

1570s

1580s

1590s

17th century

1600s

1610s

1620s

1630s

1640s

1650s

1660s

1670s

1680s

1690s

18th century

1700s

1710s

1720s

1730s

1740s

1750s

1760s

1770s

1780s

1790s

19th century

1800s

1810s

1820s

1830s

1840s

1850s

1860s

1870s

1880s

1890s

20th century

1900s

1910s

1920s

1930s

1940s

1950s

1960s

1970s

1980s

1990s

21st century

2000s

2010s

2020s

Notes

See also 
 Timeline of Manila
 Timeline of the Philippine Revolution
 Timeline of the Philippine–American War
 List of disasters in the Philippines
 List of presidents of the Philippines

References

Further reading

External links
 
 
 
 "Philippines History Timeline Chronological Timetable of Events (Parts 1, 2, 3)" worldatlas.
 
 
 
 
 
 
 
 Detailed timeline

Years in the Philippines

Philippine